Pabstiella elegantula is a species of orchid and is native to Brazil.

References 

elegantula
Plants described in 1908
Flora of Brazil
Taxa named by Alfred Cogniaux